Song of the City is a 1937 American musical film directed by Errol Taggart, written by Michael Fessier, and starring Margaret Lindsay, Dean Jagger, J. Carrol Naish, Nat Pendleton, Dennis Morgan and Marla Shelton. It was released on April 2, 1937, by Metro-Goldwyn-Mayer.

Plot
Paul Herrick falls overboard and gets rescued and involved with an Italian family.

Cast 
Margaret Lindsay as Angelina Romandi
Dean Jagger as Paul Herrick 
J. Carrol Naish as Mario
Nat Pendleton as Benvenuto Romandi
Dennis Morgan as Tommy 
Marla Shelton as Jane Lansing
Inez Palange as Mrs. 'Mama' Romandi
Charles Judels as Mr. Pietro 'Papa' Romandi
Edward Norris as Guido Romandi
Fay Helm as Marge
Frank Puglia as Tony

References

External links 
 

1937 films
American musical films
1937 musical films
Metro-Goldwyn-Mayer films
Films directed by Errol Taggart
American black-and-white films
1930s English-language films
1930s American films